Gruter or Grüter is a surname. It may refer to:

Gruter
Jan Gruter or Gruytère, Latinized as Janus Gruterus (1560–1627), Flemish-born philologist, scholar, and librarian

Grüter
Thomas Grüter (born 1966), Swiss footballer 
Franz Grüter (born 1963), Swiss businessman and politician

See also
Gruters, disambiguation
Gruter Institute, California-based American institute for Law and Behavioral Research